Paul Newby (born 13 September 1977) is an English karate practitioner and coach, a two-time bronze European medalist, and the 2004 −60 kg WKF men's kumite world champion. Newby briefly took up a career as a professional boxer, following his karate world championship win. As of November 2019, he is a kumite coach for the Great Britain national karate team.

References

External links

Sportspeople from Keighley
Living people
English male karateka
Karate coaches
English male boxers
Competitors at the 2001 World Games
Welterweight boxers
1977 births